Artemis is the ancient Greek goddess of the hunt, the wilderness, wild animals, the Moon, and chastity.

Artemis may also refer to:

Arts, entertainment, and media

Fictional entities 
 Artemis (DC Comics), a goddess in the DC Universe
 Artemis (Marvel Comics), a goddess in the Marvel Universe
 Artemis (Sailor Moon), a cat character in Codename: Sailor V and Sailor Moon
 Artemis (Transformers), a character in Beast Wars II: Super Life-Form Transformers
 Artemis, a fictional Scottish ship in Diana Gabaldon's Voyager (novel)
 Artemis of Bana-Mighdall, an Amazon superheroine in DC Comics
 Artemis Crock, a supervillain and superhero in DC Comics
 Artemis Entreri, character in the Forgotten Realms campaign setting for Dungeons & Dragons 
 Artemis Fowl II, the main protagonist in the Artemis Fowl media franchise
 Art3mis, a character in Ready Player One 
 HMS Artemis, a fictional ship in The Ship by C. S. Forester

Literature
 Artemis (magazine), a 1902–1903 Armenian women's literary magazine
 Artemis (novel), a 2017 novel by Andy Weir
 Artemis, a 2002 novel in the Thomas Kydd series by Julian Stockwin
 Artemis Fowl, a series of books by Eoin Colfer
 Artemis Fowl (novel), the first novel in the series

Other uses in arts, entertainment, and media
 Artemis Fowl (film), 2020 film adaptation of the 2001 novel
 Artemis: Spaceship Bridge Simulator, a spaceship bridge simulation game
 Artemis (album), a 2019 album by Lindsey Stirling
 "Artemis" (song), a 2019 song by Lindsey Stirling
 Artemis, a song by  Aurora, from the album The Gods We Can Touch
 Artemis, a jazz collective founded by Renee Rosnes in 2020

Organizations and enterprises
 Artemis (brothel), a large brothel in Berlin, Germany
 Artemis (fund managers), a UK-based investment management firm
 Artemis Networks, a wireless technology company
 Artemis Racing, a professional sailing team
 Artemis Records, a New York-based independent record label
 Groupe Artémis, a French holding company

Military
 Artemis 30, an anti-aircraft gun
 Operation Artemis, a 2003 military operation in the Democratic Republic of the Congo
 Project Artemis, a 1960s U.S. Navy project to produce a long-range sonar system

People
 Artemisia I of Caria (fl. 480 BCE), ancient Anatolian/Greek queen and naval commander
 Artimus Parker (1952–2004), American football player
 Artemis Pebdani (born 1977), American actress
 Artimus Pyle (born 1948), drummer for the band Lynyrd Skynyrd

Places

Extraterrestrial
 Artemis (crater), a lunar crater
 105 Artemis, an asteroid
 Artemis Chasma, a large chasma or depression on Venus
 Artemis Corona, the largest corona on Venus

Terrestrial
 Artemis (island), near Crete, Greece
 Artemida, Attica, a suburban town in east Attica, Greece
 Artemus, Kentucky, United States

Science and technology

Biology
 Artemis, the founder of a line of transgenic goats producing human lysozyme
 Artemis, a protein encoded by the human gene DCLRE1C
 Artemis complex, a protein complex involved in immunological diversity

Computing
 Artemis (software), a software package for project management
 Generic!Artemis, a computer virus
 HTC Artemis, a Windows Mobile PDA/phone

Spaceflight
 ARTEMIS, NASA probes ARTEMIS-P1 and ARTEMIS-P2
 Artemis (satellite), a geostationary communications satellite
 ARTEMIS, a hyperspectral imager aboard the TacSat-3 satellite
 Artemis Accords, an agreement on the principles for cooperation in the civil exploration and use of the Moon, Mars, comets, and asteroids for peaceful purposes
 Artemis program, a NASA attempt to return humans to the Moon by 2025
 Artemis Project, a private venture to establish a lunar community

Ships
 , the name of several ships
 , a submarine built in 1946
 MV Artemis, the name of several motor vessels
 SS Artemis, the name of several steamships
 USS Artemis, the name of several ships of the United States Navy

Other uses
 Eterniti Artemis, a car built by Eterniti Motors

See also
 Artemas (disambiguation)
 Artemesia (disambiguation)
 Artemisa (disambiguation)
 Artemisia (disambiguation)
 Artemiz (disambiguation)
 Artemus (disambiguation)
 Arty (disambiguation)